Speaker diarisation (or diarization) is the process of partitioning an audio stream containing human speech into homogeneous segments according to the identity of each speaker. It can enhance the readability of an automatic speech transcription by structuring the audio stream into speaker turns and, when used together with speaker recognition systems, by providing the speaker’s true identity. It is used to answer the question "who spoke when?"
Speaker diarisation is a combination of speaker segmentation and speaker clustering. The first aims at finding speaker change points in an audio stream. The second aims at grouping together speech segments on the basis of speaker characteristics.

With the increasing number of broadcasts, meeting recordings and voice mail collected every year, speaker diarisation has received much attention by the speech community, as is manifested by the specific evaluations devoted to it under the auspices of the National Institute of Standards and Technology for telephone speech, broadcast news and meetings.

Main types of diarisation systems 
In speaker diarisation, one of the most popular methods is to use a Gaussian mixture model to model each of the speakers, and assign the corresponding frames for each speaker with the help of a Hidden Markov Model. There are two main kinds of clustering scenario. The first one is by far the most popular and is called Bottom-Up. The algorithm starts in splitting the full audio content in a succession of clusters and progressively tries to merge the redundant clusters in order to reach a situation where each cluster corresponds to a real speaker. The second clustering strategy is called top-down and starts with one single cluster for all the audio data and tries to split it iteratively until reaching a number of clusters equal to the number of speakers.

More recently, speaker diarisation is performed thanks to neural networks and heavier GPU computing made possible some more efficient diarisation algorithm.

Open source speaker diarisation software 

There are some open source initiatives for speaker diarisation (in alphabetical order):

ALIZE Speaker Diarization (last repository update: July 2016; last release: February 2013, version: 3.0): ALIZE Diarization System, developed at the University Of Avignon, a release 2.0 is available .
Audioseg (last repository update: May 2014; last release: January 2010, version: 1.2): AudioSeg is a toolkit dedicated to audio segmentation and classification of audio streams. .
 pyannote.audio (last repository update: August 2022, last release: July 2022, version: 2.0): pyannote.audio is an open-source toolkit written in Python for speaker diarization. .
pyAudioAnalysis (last repository update: August 2018): Python Audio Analysis Library: Feature Extraction, Classification, Segmentation and Applications 
SHoUT (last update: December 2010; version: 0.3): SHoUT is a software package  developed at the University of Twente to aid speech recognition research. SHoUT is a Dutch acronym for Speech Recognition Research at the University of Twente. 
SpkDiarization (last release: September 2013, version: 8.4.1): LIUM_SpkDiarization tool .

References

Bibliography 
 
 

Speech recognition
Speech processing